Ahmad Birrul Walidain (born 14 December 1995) is an Indonesian professional footballer who plays as a right-back for Liga 1 club Persija Jakarta.

Club career

Persela Lamongan
He made his professional debut in Liga 1 on April 16, 2017 against PSM Makassar. On 27 May 2017, Birrul scored his first goal for Persela against PS TIRA in the 86th minute at the Pakansari Stadium, Bogor.

Persikabo 1973
In 2022, Birrul signed a contract with Indonesian Liga 1 club Persikabo 1973. He made his league debut on 3 February 2022 in a match against Bali United at the Ngurah Rai Stadium, Denpasar.

Madura United
Birrul was signed for Madura United to play in Liga 1 in the 2022–23 season. He made his league debut on 19 August 2022 in a match against Dewa United at the Gelora Bangkalan Stadium, Bangkalan.

Persija Jakarta
On 29 January 2023, Birrul signed a contract with Liga 1 club Persija Jakarta from Madura United. Birrul made his league debut for the club in a 3–1 win against RANS Nusantara, coming on as a substituted Ilham Rio Fahmi.

Career statistics

Club

References

External links
 
 Ahmad Birrul Walidain at Liga Indonesia

1995 births
Living people
Indonesian footballers
Persela Lamongan players
Persikabo 1973 players
Madura United F.C. players
Liga 1 (Indonesia) players
Association football forwards
Association football defenders
People from Lamongan Regency
Sportspeople from East Java